Joseph Nérette (April 9, 1924 – April 29, 2007) was a Haitian judge and political figure. He served as the provisional president of Haiti between 1991 and 1992, part of a period in which real political authority rested with the military junta headed by Raoul Cédras and Michel François.

Nérette got his law degree in 1950. He served as substitute prosecutor in Port-au-Prince from 1971 to 1978. He was an appeals court judge from 1978 until 1988, when he was appointed to the Supreme Court of Haiti by a military government.

He died of lung cancer in Port-au-Prince on April 29, 2007, aged 83.

References 

1924 births
2007 deaths
Haitian judges
Deaths from lung cancer
Deaths from cancer in Haiti